The Château de Couffour or Tour du Couffour is a ruined castle situated in the French commune of Chaudes-Aigues in the Cantal département.

The original 15th-century castle, with seven towers with conical roof, was witness to the importance of this place during the Hundred Years War. The present remains consist of a tower and neighbouring buildings. The circular tower has attached to it, on the west, a smaller tower containing the spiral staircase that gives access to the upper floors. The ground floor, noticeably square, is vaulted. The rooms on the three upper floors display a more or less similar layout. Small circular rooms communicate with each of these rooms. On the first floor, one room still has 17th-century paintings where, on a background of bouquets of leaves and flowers, are inset portraits of women and landscapes in rectangular frames. The first floor room has an 18th-century painted wooden fireplace.

In the 18th century, the castle was sold to a local owner. The French Revolution and the early 19th century were a period of decline; poorly maintained, the castle fell into disrepair. Now the property of the commune of Chaudes-Aigues, Château de Couffour is listed as a monument historique by the French Ministry of Culture.

Since 2009, the castle has been a hotel-restaurant with 2 stars in the Michelin Guide, under Serge Vieira, winner of the Bocuse d'Or in 2005.

See also
 List of castles in France

References

External links

 
 Serge Vieira website 

Ruined castles in Auvergne-Rhône-Alpes
Cantal
Monuments historiques of Auvergne-Rhône-Alpes